George Agar may refer to:

George Agar, 1st Baron Callan (1751–1815), Irish politician
George Agar-Ellis, 1st Baron Dover (1797–1833), British politician and man of letters
George Agar (rugby league) (1902–1966), Australian rugby league player